Rosa Maria Martinez can refer to:
Mirtha Legrand (born Rosa María Juana Martínez Suárez in 1927), Argentine actress
Lina Romay (born Rosa María Almirall Martínez, 1954–2012), Spanish Catalan actress
Rosa María Martínez Denegri, president of Mexican party Authentic Party of the Mexican Revolution in the 1990s
Rosa María Martínez, producer of Mexican 2000 TV series Ramona (2000 TV series)